Rhyme Skool is a two-part audio CD album of common nursery rhymes narrated by Bollywood actor Katrina Kaif. The album was produced by KM Music Conservatory and the Saregama Production Company.  A.R.Rahman supervised the music, which was composed and orchestrated by his students at the KM Music Conservatory.

Background
"Rhyme Skool" was the first audio CD released by KM Music Conservatory after its launch in 2008. All the scores were recorded, mixed, and mastered at the Audio Media studio in Chennai, where Rahman's main orchestrations were conducted. The album was based on well-known nursery rhymes. The album's official release was held in 2010 at the Intercontinental Hotel in Mumbai. In 2011, the production company launched the second album in the series, Rhyme Skool Vol 2.

Students of the KM Conservatory recorded the album under the guidance of guitarist John Anthony, along with Sivamani and A.R. Rahman.

Personnel

Primary musicians
 John Anthony        - Guitars 
 Keith Peters        - Bass
Dinesh Subasinghe- Violin, Ravanahatha, Ektara
 Annad Veer Singh    - Harmonica
 Ganeshan S          - Percussion
 Vashish Trivedi     - Flute
 Jerry Silvester Vincent - Keyboards/Programming

Music arrangers
Neehar Dabade
Jerry Silvester Vincent
Ganesan S
Rachinthan Trivedi
Sanjay Sathyan
Ankana Arockiam
Santosh Kumar
Mannmohan Taneja

Vocals
Adithi Deborah
Mugdha Hasbanis
Harshitha Krishnan
Yashwant Gocha
Dinesh Rahate
Ashrita Arociam
Neehar Dabade
Deepmala
Ritesh

Track listing

References

A. R. Rahman albums
2010s spoken word albums
Albums recorded in India
2010 albums
Nursery rhymes
Children's music albums